Pšajnovica (in older sources also Pišajnovica) is a small settlement in the Tuhinj Valley in the Municipality of Kamnik in the Upper Carniola region of Slovenia.

Church

The local church is dedicated to Saint Leonard.

References

External links

Pšajnovica on Geopedia

Populated places in the Municipality of Kamnik